Coconut chutney is a south Indian chutney, a side-dish or a condiment, common in the Indian subcontinent. The condiment is made with coconut pulp ground with other ingredients such as green chillies, tamarind, salt, coriander and water. Coconut chutney is made with both red chillies or green chillies. It is served with dosas,
idli, bajji, bonda, and vada. In Karnataka, coconut chutney is also served with rice dishes such as pulao, puliyogare, tomato baath, and vangi baath.

See also
 Kalathappam
 Kinnathappam
 Chammanthi podi
 List of chutneys

References

Indian condiments
South Indian cuisine
Chutney
Foods containing coconut